Discovery History  is a British channel with programming about history from Warner Bros. Discovery.

History
The channel was initially known as the Discovery Civilisation Channel, later dropping 'Channel' from the name, and was devoted to documentaries regarding history and civilisations, historic, ancient or present, launched on Sky Digital on 1 October 1998. On 1 November 2007, Discovery Civilisation was re-branded as Discovery Knowledge, by Heavenly. The new channel was still focused on history and natural history, but the schedule now included programming on engineering, crime and technology.

After just over three years, on 7 November 2010, Discovery Knowledge was rebranded as Discovery History. The idea behind this rebranding was to take the channel's focus back to becoming "the only UK channel dedicated to factual history", to counter the fact that its competitors History and Yesterday had begun showing more reality and scripted programming, respectively.

In February 2013, A+E Networks, who operate History, lost a High Court battle to stop Discovery from using the Discovery History brand in the UK.

Programming
Industrial Revelations
Finding the Fallen
Time Team
Planes That Never Flew
Wartime Secrets with Harry Harris
Weaponology
World War 1 in Colour
Unsolved History
 Tanks!
 Aircraft Stories
 The Tower
 Killzone
 Century of Warfare

See also
 Investigation Discovery (US)
 Discovery World
 List of documentary television channels

References

External links
Discovery Channel UK
Discovery History presentation in The Ident Gallery
Discovery Knowledge presentation on TVARK

History
Television channels and stations established in 1999
1999 establishments in the United Kingdom
Warner Bros. Discovery EMEA